The 1908 United States presidential election in Missouri took place on November 3, 1908, as part of the 1908 United States presidential election. Voters chose 18 representatives, or electors, to the Electoral College, who voted for president and vice president.

Missouri was narrowly won by Secretary of War William Howard Taft (R–Ohio), running with James S. Sherman, with 48.50% of the popular vote, against former U.S. Representative William Jennings Bryan (D–Nebraska), running with John W. Kern, with 48.41% of the popular vote.

Results

Results by county

See also
 United States presidential elections in Missouri

References

Missouri
1908
1908 Missouri elections